The Olympus E-20 (available under the names E-20N and E-20P, depending on whether it had NTSC or PAL video output, respectively) is a 5-megapixel non-interchangeable lens DSLR manufactured by Olympus Corporation of Japan, as a successor to its E-10 model. It also has a fixed lens and a beam splitting prism instead of a moving mirror. It has easy dial keys for choices of pictures, videos, and more. It was announced on September 13, 2001.

References

External links

Official sites
 Olympus America's E-20 pages

Product reviews
 DPReview's E-20 specification page
 DPReview.com's review of the E-20

Bridge digital cameras
E-20
Cameras introduced in 2001